Bhale Dongalu is a 2008 Telugu-language black comedy con film, produced by Sakhamuri Panduranga Rao, Bellamkonda Suresh on Sri Lakshmi Devi Productions banner and directed by K. Vijaya Bhaskar. A remake of the film Bunty Aur Babli, the film stars Tarun, Ileana, Jagapati Babu and music composed by K.M. Radha Krishnan. It received mixed reviews upon release.

Plot
The film begins with Ramu a young charm who has lofty dreams to become a business tycoon. However, his middle-class father always warns regarding his livelihood and proclaims him to acquire a fine job. Similarly, Jyothi a pretty girl aspires to become a top-most model but her elders forcibly fix her alliance. So, the two quits the house to make their dreams come true and acquainted on the train journey. On board, their baggage is stolen and they stand on the road without a single penny. Presently, the pair split on their ways where they face backlash. Ramu is deceived by a pawn vendor and Jyothi is kicked out of the beauty contest. At night, the duet reconciles at the railway station and mutually shares their grief. Thus, the match discerns the mainstream of the world and chooses the path of crime with the title Romeo & Juliet.

Therefrom, the twosome begins swindling the elite parties, helping the destitute, fruitfully making con after con, and falling in love. Presently, they shift to Hyderabad and en route amiable to cute kid Chinnari. Forthwith, they wittily loot a showroom owned by a bloodthirsty drug kingpin Veeraraju which incenses him and ascertains to hunt them regardless. Besides, DCP Yugandhar a jokester cop is charged to seize Romeo & Juliet. Veeraraju browbeats Yugandhar regarding Romeo & Juliet when he flares up on him that panicky Veeraraju. Plus, Yugandhar challenges to get hold of him along with Romeo & Juliet. Meanwhile, Romeo & Juliet is cognizant that Chinnari is an ailed heart patient who must get operated on soon for which 10 lakhs is necessary.

Hence, to this day they directly sharp practice Veeraraju by sticking fake drugs to him, and his men continuously chase them. Following the night, Yugandhar encounters Romeo & Juliet in a pub as unbeknownst and makes fun with them. The next day, Veeraraju rages on Yugandhar, accuses him that he is mingled with Romeo & Juliet, and even higher officials give him an ultimatum. Parallelly, Romeo & Juliet succeeds in helping pay for Chinnari's surgery and attempts to abscond. But unfortunately, they are captured by Veeraraju who seeks to slay them. At the last minute, Yugandhar land for their rescue ceases Veeraraju, and apprehend Romeo & Juliet. Now Veeraraju ploys to slaughter Yugandhar with Romeo & Juliet and plants a bomb at the Police Station which explodes. Here, Yugandhar tactically makes the counterattack by skipping Romeo & Juliet from prison also destroyed the criminal career and back to their home. At last, it is shown that Veeraraju is sentenced, Yugandhar is transferred to traffic, and the turtle dove's parents decide to knit them. Finally, the movie ends on a happy note with the marriage of Ramu & Jyothi.

Cast

Tarun as Ramu (Ram) / Romeo
Ileana as Jyothi / Juliet
Jagapati Babu as DCP Yugandhar
Pradeep Rawat as Veerraju
Chandra Mohan as Ram's father
Brahmanandam as Vengala Rao
Mallikarjuna Rao as Kotaiah
Sunil as cab driver
Venu Madhav as truck driver
M. S. Narayana as Adarsham
Dharmavarapu Subramanyam as Veerraju's brother-in-law
Chitram Seenu as bouquet seller
Ananth Babu as jewellery shop owner
Kallu Krishna Rao as TC
Kadambari Kiran
Gundu Sudharshan
Uttej
Malladi Raghava 
Vallabhaneni Janardhan
C. V. L. Narasimha Rao as Jyoti's father
Jenny as jewellery shop owner
Narsing Yadav as Veerraju's henchman
Annapoorna as Jyoti's grand mother
Sudha
Hema 
Shanoor Sana 
Charmy Kaur as Raksha in an item number "Neethone"

Soundtrack

Music composed by K.M. Radha Krishnan. Music released on ADITYA Music Company.

References

External links
 

2008 films
2000s Telugu-language films
Indian romantic comedy films
Telugu remakes of Hindi films
Indian comedy road movies
Films directed by K. Vijaya Bhaskar
Films scored by K. M. Radha Krishnan